The Nueva Planta decrees were a number of decrees signed between 1707 and 1716 by Philip V, the first Bourbon King of Spain, during and shortly after the end of the War of the Spanish Succession by the Treaty of Utrecht. Planta ("plant"), in this context, meant "structure" or "establishment" (i.e. akin to a secondary sense of the English language plant, e.g. an "industrial building"). 

The Decrees put an end to the existence of the realms of the Crown of Aragon (Aragon, Catalonia, Valencia and Majorca) as separate political entities within a common monarchy and incorporated them into the Crown of Castile, essentially establishing the Kingdom of Spain as a French-style absolute monarchy.

Historical context
Angered by what he saw as sedition by the realms of the Crown of Aragon, who had supported the claim of Charles of Austria to the Spanish thrones during the war and taking his native France as a model of a centralised state, Philip V suppressed the institutions, privileges, and the ancient charters of almost all the areas that were formerly part of the Crown of Aragon (Kingdom of Aragon, Principality of Catalonia, Kingdom of Valencia, and the Kingdom of Majorca). The decrees ruled that all the territories in the Crown of Aragon except the Aran Valley were to be ruled by the laws of Castile ("the most praiseworthy in all the Universe" according to the 1707 decree), embedding those regions into a new and nearly uniformly administered, centralised Spain.

The other historic territories (Navarre and the other Basque territories) supported Philip V initially, whom they saw as belonging to the lineage of Henry III of Navarre, but after Philip V's military campaign to crush the Basque uprising, he backed down on his intent to suppress home rule.

The acts abolishing the charters were promulgated in 1707 in Valencia and Aragon, in 1715 in Majorca and the other Balearic Islands, with the exception of Menorca, then a possession of the Kingdom of Great Britain, and on and off during the XVIII century till it was returned to Spain in 1802, and in 1716 in Catalonia.

Effects of the decrees
The decrees effectively created a Spanish state and Spanish citizenship, abolishing all legal distinctions between the Castilians and the Aragonese. The decrees erased all internal borders and tariffs except for the Basque territory, and granted all citizens of the newly created Spanish state the right to trade with the American and Asian colonies, which henceforth were no longer the exclusive domain of the Crown of Castile. Top civil servants were to be appointed directly from Madrid, and most institutions in what had become subnational entities were abolished. Court cases could also only be presented and argued in Castilian, which became the sole language of government, displacing Latin, Catalan and other languages of Spain.

See also
Perfect Fusion
Acts of Union 1707 between Scotland and England, creating the Kingdom of Great Britain
Bourbon Reforms of Philip V and his successors
Catalan Constitutions
Furs of Valencia

References
 This article draws on material from the corresponding article in the Spanish Wikipedia, accessed January 2006.

External links 
 Documents about the case of the catalans dated on 1714, at the House of Lords, UK.
 Journal of the House of Lords: volume 19, 2 August 1715, Further Articles of Impeachment against E. Oxford brought from H.C. Article VI.
Extract from the Decree of abolition of the fueros of Aragon and Valencia from Wikisource
Decree of 16 January 1716  (facsimile)

1707 in law
1715 in law
1716 in law
History of Catalonia
Principality of Catalonia
History of the Valencian Community
Linguistic rights
Legal history of Spain
Decrees